Hylambates dorsalis is a name given to a frog specimen now in the Berlin's Natural History Museum. It was proposed as the type species of the genus Dendrobatorana, but both taxa are considered as nomina inquirenda, a name that cannot be related to any known species in the wild. Its type locality is "Yoruba (Lagos)"; however, this seems erroneous as the holotype appears to be an Asian member of the family Rhacophoridae. Distribution and ecology of this frog are unknown.

References

Taxa named by Wilhelm Peters
Amphibians described in 1875
Taxonomy articles created by Polbot